A list of animated television series first aired in 1970.

See also
 List of animated feature films of 1970
 List of Japanese animation television series of 1970

References

Television series
Animated series
1970
1970
1970-related lists